Jean Quarré (1919–1942) was a French printer and communist activist. He was born in Paris, France, on September 22, 1919, and was executed on April 17, 1942. He was a member of Les Bataillons de la Jeunesse.

He was arrested February 27, 1942. He was killed by firing squad in 1942 in Paris.

A street is named after him in Paris. A refugee centre was also opened up in his name in Paris.

References

1919 births
1942 deaths
Deaths by firearm in France
People murdered in Paris
French communists
1942 murders in France
1940s murders in Paris